Hurricane Katrina's winds and storm surge reached the Mississippi coastline on the morning of August 29, 2005.
beginning a two-day path of destruction through central Mississippi; by 10a.m. CDT on August 29, 2005, the eye of Katrina began traveling up the entire state, only slowing from hurricane-force winds at Meridian near 7p.m. and entering Tennessee as a tropical storm.
Many coastal towns of Mississippi (and Louisiana) had already been obliterated, in a single night.
Many, unable to evacuate,
survived by climbing to attics or rooftops, or swimming to higher buildings and trees. The worst property damage from Katrina occurred in coastal Mississippi, where all towns flooded over 90% in hours, and waves destroyed many historic buildings, with others gutted to the 3rd story. Afterward, 238 people died in Mississippi, and all counties in Mississippi were declared disaster areas, 49 for full federal assistance.
Regulations were changed later for emergency centers and casinos. Casinos were allowed on land rather than limited to floating casino barges as in 2005.

More than one million people in Mississippi were affected, and almost 6 months later, the extent of the devastation in Mississippi was still described as "staggering" in USA Today on February 16, 2006:
"The Mississippi Gulf Coast has been devastated. The extent of the devastation in Mississippi is also staggering. Since Katrina hit, more than half a million people in Mississippi have applied for assistance from FEMA. In a state of just 2.9 million residents, that means more than one in six Mississippians have sought help.

Scattered damage
General: The effects of a hurricane can be scattered across a large area, because hurricanes are large complex storms which spawn smaller thunderstorms, tornadoes, storm surges, and sea waves. Wind speeds east of the eye can be  higher than winds west of the eye. Wind gusts can be scattered, so boats or debris can ram one house but not another. One building can seem untouched, while others nearby are flattened; also trees can be partly weakened: tree limbs can fall months later, crashing onto a roof, automobile, fence, etc.

Specific: Because Hurricane Katrina became a massive storm,

Eleven (11) spawned tornadoes were recorded in Mississippi (51 elsewhere).
It is possible that scattered damage to northern Mississippi occurred, by spin-off storms, around the time Katrina made landfall in eastern Greater New Orleans (Louisiana's "boot toe") and then, again, near Bay St. Louis, Mississippi, heading north-northeast into central Mississippi, at 10a.m. on August 29. Note that "landfall" occurred over towns submerged under 20 feet (6 m) of water. As buildings collapsed, water-tight appliances floated, sending refrigerators and dishwashers to ram other buildings and block streets. Millions of homes and buildings were affected, along with ships, boats, and more than 40 offshore oil rigs.

Roadways and railways were put out of service by excessive amounts of debris and occasional collapse (most notably the I-10 Twin Span Bridge). Costs of debris removal in the Gulf Coast region is estimated at $200 million. Until major roadways (US 49, US 59) could be cleared, deliverers of supplies and other emergency relief were forced to detour through highway 609 or highway 43/603, though these routes were not officially posted.

Impact synopsis 

The Gulf Coast of Mississippi suffered near total devastation
from Hurricane Katrina on August 29, with hurricane winds,  storm surge, and  sea waves
pushing casino barges, boats and debris into towns, and leaving 236 people dead, 67 missing, and billions of dollars in damages.

Winds reached hurricane-force in Hancock and Harrison County by 2a.m.,
and winds intensified. Other counties to see a strong hurricane force impact of Katrina were Covington County, Jefferson Davis County, Simpson County, Smith County, Hinds County, Rankin County, and Scott County. Katrina maintained a high wind capacity of 80–85 mph in cities like Mendenhall, Magee, Jackson, Brandon, and Forest in Mississippi. Those cities contained much tree damage, roof and patio damage, power line damage, and much thrown debris. In Jackson, streets were cleared off due to the intense strong winds and rains that carried throughout the entire day. During this 10a.m. timeframe, hurricane-force winds continued over the barrier islands and Louisiana peninsula nearby; however, for the remainder of Louisiana, the winds were subsiding into gale-force winds after 10a.m. when Katrina was becoming primarily a Mississippi hurricane.

Several casinos, which were floated on barges to comply with Mississippi land-based gambling laws, were washed hundreds of yards inland by waves. According to MSNBC, a  storm surge came ashore wiping out 90% of the buildings along the Biloxi-Gulfport coastline. A number of streets and bridges were washed away, including the bridge sections of U.S. Highway 90. In particular, the roadway portion of the U.S. Highway 90 bridge between Bay St. Louis and Pass Christian was completely destroyed by the storm; only the support structure was left.

The three counties most affected by the storm were Hancock County, Harrison County, and Jackson County, although almost all counties had damage, and 47 counties were declared full disaster areas.  Mississippi Emergency Management Agency 
(MEMA) officials also recorded deaths in Hinds, Warren, and Leake counties. About 800,000 people through the state experienced power outages, which is almost a third of the population.

The three coastal counties of Mississippi, populated by about 400,000 people (almost the population of central New Orleans), had been mostly evacuated before Katrina flooded the  region. Katrina's storm surge was the most extensive, as well as the highest, in the documented history of the United States; large portions of Hancock County, Harrison County, and Jackson County were inundated by the storm surge, affecting most of the populated areas.
Surge covered almost the entire lower half of Hancock County, destroying the coastal communities of Clermont Harbor and Waveland, and much of Bay St. Louis, and flowed up the Jourdan River, flooding Kiln. In Harrison County, Pass Christian was completely inundated, along with a narrow strip of land to the east along the coast, which includes the cities of Long Beach and Gulfport; the flooding was more extensive in communities such as D'Iberville, which borders the Back Bay of Biloxi. Biloxi, on a peninsula between the Back Bay and the coast, was particularly hard hit, especially the low-lying Point Cadet area.

In Jackson County, storm surge flowed up the wide river estuary, with the combined surge and freshwater floods cutting the county in half. Over 90% of Pascagoula, the easternmost coastal city in Mississippi, was flooded from surge. Other Jackson County communities such as Porteaux Bay were destroyed, and St. Martin was hard hit, along with Ocean Springs, Moss Point, Gautier, and Escatawpa.

Two destroyers that were under construction at Litton-Ingalls Shipbuilding in Pascagoula were damaged, as well as the Amphibious assault ship USS Makin Island.

Surveying the damage the day after Katrina's passing, Mississippi governor Haley Barbour called the scene indescribable, saying "I can only imagine that this is what Hiroshima looked like 60 years ago."
The mayor of Biloxi, A.J. Holloway, told the Biloxi Sun Herald, "This is our tsunami."

Many historic buildings were destroyed in Mississippi, including the cottages and second-story porches around the Beauvoir mansion, home of Jefferson Davis. Hundreds of irreplaceable Civil War-era artifacts from the Jefferson Davis home and museum were either lost or destroyed.

The lower three floors of many high-rise casinos and hotels were gutted. (See details below).

Along with countless others affected by the hurricane, U.S. senator Trent Lott lost his Pascagoula home, and the boyhood home of Green Bay Packers quarterback Brett Favre was also totally destroyed.

Psychological impact
Both the Mississippi residents who survived the hurricanes as well as the disaster relief workers who supported them are at high risk of developing Post-Traumatic Stress Disorder, or PTSD, a mental health disorder that can develop after exposure to an extreme situation such as warfare, a natural disaster or abuse.

Path of Hurricane Katrina 

Although Hurricane Katrina later travelled mainly through Mississippi,
it began as a Category 1 hurricane on August 25, crossing the southern tip
of Florida (raining  [36 cm]) into the Gulf, where it weakened, then strengthened
into a massive Category 5 with  sustained winds. Slowly turning north along the eastern coast of Louisiana, at 4a.m.
As Katrina came ashore near Buras, LA at 6:10 CDT, with
CDT),
with hurricane-force winds travelling up central Mississippi until weakening at Meridian,
and entering Tennessee as a tropical storm. The waves pushed barges, oil rigs, ships, and debris into submerged towns to flatten many coastal buildings across to Pascagoula with  surge,  and into Alabama with  surge and  waves battering beach houses inside Mobile Bay and tilting the battleship . (See extensive details below).

Mississippi evacuation 
By 4:30 a.m. CDT, on August 29, 2005, just hours before Hurricane Katrina landfall, many shelters in Mississippi were full to capacity, including many Red Cross shelters, the Jackson Coliseum (which allowed pets), and five special-needs shelters. The shelters had filled within 24 hours of opening.

Days earlier, on August 25, when Hurricane Katrina crossed the southern tip of Florida, government offices in Mississippi had already discussed emergency evacuation plans for days. On August 26, the Mississippi National Guard was activated, raising the level of concern, and on August 27, the state government activated its Emergency Operations Center, and local governments began issuing evacuation orders: the Mississippi Emergency Management Agency (MEMA) advised not opening shelters in coastal counties. However, on August 28, the Red Cross also opened shelters in coastal counties, and by 7:00 p.m., 11 counties and eleven cities issued evacuation orders, a number which increased to 41 counties and 61 cities before the following morning, when Katrina came ashore. Moreover, 57 emergency shelters were established on coastal communities, with 31 additional shelters available to open if needed....

Since the evacuation was not total, many people survived the  storm tide by climbing into the second-floor attic, or knocking out walls and ceiling boards to climb onto the roof or nearby trees.  Tree trunks remained standing, even near the beaches, where many houses were leveled. Other people had swum to taller buildings or trees.
Over 100 people were rescued from roof tops and trees in Mississippi.

Federal buildings/projects 
Because of federal intent to rebuild or recover projects of the US Federal Government, the damage assessment to federal buildings in Mississippi covers actual costs: the amount needed to resume operations at market costs. The following federal projects are described in terms of damage, along with the cost to resume operations:

 $1.987 billion: as requested by President George W. Bush, for Navy Shipbuilding and Conversion; these funds will assist Northrop Grumman to "replace destroyed or damaged equipment, prepare and recover naval vessels under contract; and provide for cost adjustments."  Ships were damaged in Pascagoula.
 (unknown): as increased funding for USDA housing programs which provide subsidized loans and housing repair funding.
 $75 million: in wildlife habitat restoration, for the Corps of Engineers to enhance estuarine habitats in Mississippi: following the Governor's proposal regarding oyster reef and coastal marsh restoration. The Mississippi Department of Marine Resources will assist the Corps as these projects develop.
 $75 million: for the Corps of Engineers on various coastal projects: to accelerate completion of authorized projects along the Mississippi Gulf Coast.
 $1.1 billion: to repair vital federal facilities in Mississippi, including:
 $292.5 million for the repair and renovation of the VA hospital in Biloxi.
 $45 million for the Armed Forces Retirement Home in Gulfport.
 $277.2 million for the United States Navy to help rebuild the Seabee base in Gulfport, and the Stennis Space Center.
 $43.4 million to help rebuild Keesler Air Force Base.
 $45 million for the Keesler Medical Center.
 $82.8 million for new Navy housing in the Gulfport/Stennis region.
 $324.8 million for housing at Keesler Air Force Base.
 $48.9 million for Navy housing at the Naval Air Station Meridian and at the Seabee base in Gulfport.

The cost amounts were decided for work continuing in 2006. Note that repairs include modern renovation, since it is not feasible to assess damage in terms of restoring federal buildings to the year they were built. However, the costs provide a condensed measure of the construction damage, without counting the millions of lost roof tiles, thousands of broken windows, etc.

Hancock County 

Hancock County was the scene of the final landfall of the eye of Hurricane Katrina, causing total devastation in Waveland, Bay St. Louis, Pearlington, and Clermont Harbor, as well as southern Diamondhead. The bridge between Bay St. Louis and Pass Christian was destroyed.

Katrina's  storm surge, and  sea waves, practically obliterated Waveland, Mississippi, and state officials said that it took a harder hit from the wind and water than any other town along the coast. The storm dragged away almost every structure within one half mile of the beach, leaving driveways and walkways that went to nowhere. The death toll was estimated at 50.

Katrina also destroyed the first floor and dormitories of Saint Stanislaus All Boys High School.

The destruction brought forth by Katrina also caused about one-quarter of the labor force to lose their jobs, with the unemployment rate reaching as high as 24.3%.

Harrison County 

Harrison County, Mississippi was hit particularly hard by the hurricane and the storm surge. Its two largest coastal cities, Biloxi and Gulfport, suffered severe damages and a number of casualties. By September 126 people were already confirmed dead.  Smaller coastal towns were also severely damaged. Much of Long Beach and most of Pass Christian, which bore the brunt of Category 5 Hurricane Camille in 1969, were leveled. Nearby Gulfshore Baptist Assembly, a camp owned and operated by the Mississippi Baptist Convention, has been permanently closed, and recommendations have been made to build a new facility elsewhere.

In the tourist town of Biloxi, widespread damage was reported as several of the city's attractions were destroyed. The lower 3 floors of many high-rise casino-hotels were gutted, as in the former Grand Casino of Gulfport, or the Imperial Palace (IP Hotel and Casino) or Beau Rivage in Biloxi.  Many restaurants were destroyed and several casino barges had been washed out of the water and onto land. Residents who survived Hurricane Camille stated that Katrina was "much worse," with a storm surge reportedly reaching further inland than the previous catastrophic storm. Katrina's wind estimates were lighter than Camille's, and the central air pressure was slightly higher, but Camille was also a much smaller storm so the greater impact of the storm surge may be due to the size. Keesler Air Force Base, also located in Biloxi, reported extensive damage to its facilities. Gulfport authorities reported to news station CNN that up to ten feet of water covered downtown streets. The Biloxi-Ocean Springs Bridge was also totally destroyed, and US 90 had heavy debris and severe damage to the roadbed.

Thirty of the confirmed deaths in Harrison County were at the St. Charles apartment complex, said Kelly Jakubic with the county's Emergency Operations Center. The apartment complex was reported, by local news sources, to have collapsed with dozens of residents inside. FOX News also reported deaths at the Quiet Water Beach apartments. (A later investigation by Biloxi's WLOX could not confirm any deaths at these apartments.)

Rebuilding in Harrison County proceeded at different paces in different towns. The town of Biloxi was greatly helped by the resurgence of the casino industry, while smaller towns such as Pass Christian did not have an economic base with which to start the reconstruction effort. By January 2007, almost a year and a half after the Hurricane, Pass Christian had still not yet begun rebuilding its city buildings, and volunteer labor was still involved in rebuilding private homes in the town.

The ECHL Mississippi Sea Wolves, which play in Biloxi, was forced to suspend operations for two years because of the aftermath of the hurricane causing damage to the Mississippi Coast Coliseum. The team resumed play in 2007.

Jackson County

In Jackson County, the storm surge flowed up the wide river estuary, with the combined surge and freshwater floods cutting the county in half. Over 90% of Pascagoula, the easternmost coastal city in
Other Jackson County communities such as Porteaux Bay and Gulf Hills were destroyed, and St. Martin was hard hit; Ocean Springs, Moss Point, Gautier, and Escatawpa also suffered major surge damage.

United States Navy officials announced that two Arleigh Burke-class guided missile destroyers that were under construction at Litton-Ingalls Shipbuilding in Pascagoula had been damaged by the storm, as well as the amphibious assault ship USS Makin Island.

County totals

After Hurricane Katrina, all counties in Mississippi were declared disaster areas, with 49 counties eligible for full Federal assistance. The following Mississippi counties (alphabetical order) reported deaths, tornadoes, or damage:

 Adams County: reported 2 deaths.
 Forrest County: reported 7 deaths.
 Hancock County: reported 51 deaths.
 Harrison County: reported 126 deaths.
 Hinds County: reported 1 death.
 Jackson County: reported 12 deaths, and 2 tornadoes.
 Jasper County: reported 1 tornado.
 Jones County: reported 12 deaths.
 Kemper County: reported 1 tornado.
 Lamar County: reported 1 tornado.
 Lauderdale County: reported 2 deaths, and 1 tornado.
 Leake County: reported 1 death, and 3 tornadoes.
 Lowndes County: reported 1 tornado.
 Neshoba County: reported 2 tornadoes.
 Oktibbeha County: reported 1 tornado.
 Pearl River County: reported 17 deaths.
 Scott County: reported 1 tornado.
 Simpson County: reported 1 death.
 Stone County: reported 1 death.
 Warren County: reported 1 death.
 Winston County: reported 1 tornado.

The names of the 49 counties in Mississippi, declared disaster areas for full Federal assistance, are:
Adams, Amite, Attala, Claiborne, Choctaw, Clarke, Copiah, Covington, Franklin, Forrest, George, Greene, Hancock, Harrison, Hinds, Holmes, Humphreys, Jackson, Jasper, Jefferson, Jefferson Davis, Jones, Kemper, Lamar, Lauderdale, Lawrence, Leake, Lincoln, Lowndes, Madison, Marion, Neshoba, Newton, Noxubee, Oktibbeha, Pearl River, Perry, Pike, Rankin, Scott, Simpson, Smith, Stone, Walthall, Warren, Wayne, Wilkinson, Winston and Yazoo.
Taxpayers were eligible for automatic relief in the 49 Mississippi counties designated for individual assistance.

Other counties were affected as well.

In the region
Since Hurricane Katrina traveled up the entire state, Mississippi lies in the center of the disaster areas for the region. Outside the area of high winds and storm surge, other areas were affected by spin-off tornadoes and rainfall flooding. The map below shows the declared disaster areas in the region.

Long-term impact
Rebuilding of towns took years, and some areas were not restored. The bay bridges were rebuilt taller and stronger, as had been done around Pensacola in the years following Hurricane Ivan (2004). The casino-gambling regulations were changed to allow casinos to be built on land in taller buildings, no longer forcing the use of massive floating casino barges near a city, which could again become battering rams along 2nd and 3rd-story levels of nearby hotels. Many local Gulf Coast water systems were destroyed in the storm. The state government opted to have them reconstructed as a handful of regional water systems and one large regional sewage system.

Celebrities who had previously visited New Orleans came to understand the massive devastation that occurred along the Gulf Coast cities. The US Army Corps of Engineers developed plans to rebuild the protective barrier islands that had been washed out to sea along the coastal areas. Detailed reports were written describing how people had survived by swimming to taller buildings or trees, and noting that those too old or unable to swim did not survive. Many residents moved away and never returned. Medical studies attempted to estimate the indirect deaths caused by people losing their homes or local medical support.

See also
Hurricane Katrina effects by region

References

Further reading

External links

Katrina, One Year Later: Three Perspectives Photos of the Mississippi Gulf Coast by David Wharton, Bruce West and Todd Bertolaet.
Aftermath of Katrina on the Mississippi Gulf Coast (Photo Essay)
December 2005 issue of MS Economic Review and Outlook
Interviews about Katrina with Mississippi community activists
 Healing Katrina: Volunteering in Post-Hurricane Mississippi

Mississippi
Hurricanes in Mississippi
2005 in Mississippi
Katrina Mississippi